Brian Borrows (born 20 December 1960) is an English football coach and former professional footballer who is a regional coach for the Professional Footballers' Association.

As a player he was a defender from 1980 until 1999, most notably playing in the Premier League for Coventry City, where he made 409 appearances, scoring 11 and winning the FA Cup. Prior to this he had played for both Everton and Bolton Wanderers. He finished playing career in the Football League with Bristol City and Swindon Town.

Following his retirement he had spells as assistant manager of both Coventry City and Derby County.

Career
Brian Borrows was born in Liverpool. He signed for Coventry City from Bolton Wanderers in 1985 and apart from the rare injury was the club's regular right back for nearly a decade, missing fewer than 20 games. Whilst the era produced such terrace favourites as Gibson, Bennett, Regis and Speedie, Borrows fell into that category of player who quietly went about their business season after season to an exceptionally high standard. A right back with first class spatial awareness and close ball control, in another era, (some City fans might say "at a more fashionable club") he might have been an England squad regular.

Far from being a 'workmanlike' full-back, Borrows possessed a great cross and burst of speed which was used to great effect for forwards like Houchen, Speedie and Regis. He was also to play a key defensive role during the 1987 cup run, which included outstanding battling away displays against the likes of Stoke City (5th Round) and Sheffield Wednesday (6th Round). Coventry would later go on to lift the trophy for the first time in their 104-year history against Tottenham Hotspur. Unfortunately for Borrows,  he twisted his knee just seven days before the 1987 FA Cup Final, and was forced to miss the game. As a result, his name was chanted many times that afternoon on 16 May 1987 from the Coventry sections of Wembley Stadium. He did however play a part in the Charity Shield showpiece versus Everton later that same year.

He scored several times for Coventry City, mostly from free kicks and the penalty spot, and remains a very respected figure among former players and fans alike. His understanding with Trevor Peake, Brian Kilcline and Steve Ogrizovic formed the foundation stone upon which George Curtis and John Sillett were  able to rebuild the club's fortunes after years of under achievement. His playing career spanned some of the great changes in modern British football, from the pre-Sky era of open terracing to the super stadia and media saturation of the Premiership. 'Bugsy' as he was affectionately known at the club, made 474 total appearances scoring a total of 13 goals.

He was voted Coventry City 'Player of the Year' for the 1989/90 season. He also secured a representative honour as an England 'B' cap in 1990.

Coaching career
He spent time coaching the Academy sides of his former club Coventry and Derby County before becoming a Regional Coach for the Professional Footballers' Association in the Midlands area.

Personal life
Brian Borrows is included in the Coventry City Hall of Fame at the Ricoh Arena.

Honours
 Coventry City F.C. Hall of Fame

References

● Playfair football annuals

External links

Brian Borrows - Coventry City - Football-Heroes.net
Swindon-Town-FC.co.uk- Brian Borrows

Living people
1960 births
Association football defenders
English footballers
Everton F.C. players
Bolton Wanderers F.C. players
Coventry City F.C. players
Bristol City F.C. players
Swindon Town F.C. players
Premier League players
Footballers from Liverpool
Coventry City F.C. non-playing staff
Derby County F.C. non-playing staff